The sixth annual MTV Romania Music Awards were held on May 10, 2007 in Sibiu at the Piata Mare and included guest Sean Paul.

Nominees and winners

Best Group
 3Sud Est - Iubire
 Akcent - French Kiss
 DJ Project - Inca o noapte
 Hi-Q - Razna
 Simplu - Oficial imi merge bine WINNER

Best Song
 3Sud Est - Iubire
 Cleopatra Stratan - Ghita WINNER
 DJ Project - Esti tot ce am
 Stefan Banica JR ft Stefan Banica SR - Cum am ajuns sa te iubesc

Best Female
 Anda Adam - Nai Nai
 Anna Lesko - 24
 Corina ft Toni Cottura - Quieres una aventura
 Loredana - Departare- WINNER

Best Male
 Alex - Yamasha
 Cheloo - Operatiunea c*r pansat
 Florin Chilian - Zece
 Pavel Stratan - Nunta
 Stefan Banica JR - Toata lumea danseaza - WINNER

Best Hip-Hop
 Bitza - Armele pregatite
 BUG Mafia ft Alexandra Vlad - Viata Noastra
 Cheloo - Operatiunea c*r pansat - WINNER
 Sisu si Puya ft Alex - Mai vrei
 Spike ft Cheloo - Bizar

Best New Artist
 Adrian Eftimie - No side effect
 Alex - Yamasha
 Andi ft Aida - For the First Time
 Cleopatra Stratan - Ghita - WINNER
 Spike ft Cheloo - Bizar

Best Dance
 3Sud Est - Iubire
 Activ - Reasons
 Akcent - French Kiss
 DJ Project - Esti tot ce am - WINNER

Best Album
 Activ - Everyday WINNER
 Cleopatra Stratan - La varsta de 3 ani
 DJ Project - Povestea mea
 Voltaj - Revelator

Best Rock
 Cross - Un minut
 Iris - Vino pentru totdeauna - WINNER
 Keo - Dac-as putea sa zbor
 Voltaj - Stiu
 Zdob si Zdub - Miorita

Best Live Act
 Directia 5
 Loredana
 Mandinga
 Stefan Banica JR - WINNER
 Voltaj

Best Pop
 Andra - Ramai cu mine
 Directia 5 - Stai!Nu ma ocoli
 Florin Chilian - ZeceWINNER
 Holograf - Esti asa frumoasa

Best Video
 Corina - Overdrive
 Directia 5 - Stai!Nu ma ocoli
 Florin Chilian - Zece
 Simplu - Oficial imi merge bine WINNER

Best Website
 www.20cmrecords.com
 www.dj-project.ro
 www.trupaheaven.ro - WINNER
 www.proconsul.com.ro
 www.activmusic.ro

Best Alternative
 Animal X ft Corina - Ca la inceput
 Cassaloco - Tu si cu prietena ta
 OCS - Iaurt
 Suie Paparude - Armada verbala - WINNER
 Tmpuri Noi - Umbrela

Best International Artist
 Sean Paul

Lifetime Award

References

External links
 Official MTV Romania Music Awards 2007 Website

MTV Romania Music Awards
2007 in Romanian music
Romanian music awards